The  is one of the former state agencies of Japan. Ministry of the Interior's foreign bureau. Its purpose was to increase the prestige of Shintoism among the people and it was the core of shrine administration and Shintoism until the end of WWII.

Showa's early Divinities revival movement and movement to establish special divine offices In response to the 1940, it was established on the occasion of the commemoration of the 2600th anniversary of the accession of Jimmu in 1940. After the defeat of Japan in World War II, the Shinto Directive was issued by the Supreme Commander for the Allied Powers (GHQ), and the Shinto Directive was terminated on January 31, 1946., it was abolished as of January 31, 1946.。

Establishment of the Institute of Divine Worship 
In accordance with the Government Regulations of the Institute of Shinto Religion (Imperial Ordinance No. 736 of 1940), the Bureau of Shrines of the Home Ministry was elevated to a higher rank and established as an external bureau of the Ministry on November 9, 1940. It is located at 1-2, Kasumigaseki, Kojimachi-ku, Tokyo (Ministry of Home Affairs Office Building).

The president was appointed by the Minister of Home Affairs, and Eiji Yasui, Minister of Home Affairs, was appointed as the first president. The Vice President was Ichisho Inuma, Director General of the Bureau of Shrines, who served in this position until the abolition of the JCG.

The President's Secretariat, the General Affairs Bureau, and the Political Affairs Bureau were established to take charge of matters related to the Jingu shrine, matters related to shrines under the government and national government, matters related to priests and priesthood, and matters related to the spread of reverence for the Shinto religion.

Shinto Directive and Abolition of the Institute of Divinities 
On December 15, 1945, GHQ issued a memorandum to the government, "Regarding the Abolition of the Government's Guarantee, Support, Preservation, Supervision, and Supervision of National Shinto and Shinto Shrines and the Abolition of Kobu" (SCAPIN-448), which resulted in the abolition of the Institute of Divinities.

In accordance with the Imperial Ordinance No. 59 of 1946, the Institute of Divinities was abolished as of January 31, 1946, and the Institute of Divinities was abolished as of January 31, 1946, in accordance with the Imperial Ordinance No. 59 of 1946, "Concerning Revision of Government Regulations for the Implementation of Administrative Reorganization.

See also 

 State Shinto
 Shrine Shinto
 Department of Divinities
 Ministry of Divinities

References

Literature 

 国立国会図書館　デジタルコレクション　神社祭式行事作法　内務省神祇院教務局祭務課編集　昭和17年　書誌ID　000000664653　P15　https://dl.ndl.go.jp/info:ndljp/pid/1040190/1
 国立国会図書館　デジタルコレクション　告示 / 内務省 / 第76号 / 神社祭式行事作法　明治40年　https://dl.ndl.go.jp/info:ndljp/pid/2950545
 国立国会図書館　デジタルコレクション　神社局時代を語る　神祇院教務局調査課　昭和17年　https://dl.ndl.go.jp/info:ndljp/pid/1057614
 国立国会図書館　デジタルコレクション　神社本義　神祇院編集　昭和19年　https://dl.ndl.go.jp/info:ndljp/pid/1040153
 国立国会図書館　デジタルコレクション　神奈川県内政部 / 神社祭式行事作法解説　昭和18年　P21　22　23　https://dl.ndl.go.jp/info:ndljp/pid/1097500

Government agencies disestablished in 1946
Government agencies established in 1940
State Shinto
Home Ministry (Japan)
Pages with unreviewed translations